Beelen is a municipality in the district of Warendorf, in North Rhine-Westphalia, Germany. It is situated approximately 30 km south-west of Bielefeld and 35 km east of Münster.

Mayors
 1989–1991: Siegbert Elsing (FWG)
 1991–1994: Josef Aulenkamp (CDU)
 1994–1995: Elisabeth Kammann (FWG)
 1995–1999: Heinrich Schwarzenberg (CDU)
 1999–2004: Martin Braun (independent)
 2004–2020: Elisabeth Kammann (FWG)
 since 2020: Rolf Mestekemper

Twin towns
  Villers-Écalles (France)

References

External links
 Official site 

Towns in North Rhine-Westphalia